Pádraic Ó Neachtain (born 1973) is an Irish television presenter, director, and journalist.

He works for Telegael in Spiddal and presents feature programmes for the TG4 channel. He is a native of Inverin, County Galway. He is the eldest of five siblings. Ó Neachtain has presented, directed, and edited programmes for the TG4, RTÉ, and Nuacht RTÉ channels. He has worked for the Irish Farmers Journal and the Irish language newspaper Foinse.

References

1973 births
20th-century Irish people
21st-century Irish people
Living people
Alumni of the University of Galway
Echo Island presenters
Irish male voice actors
People from County Galway
TG4 presenters